Llanaber railway station serves the village of Llanaber near Barmouth in Gwynedd, Wales. The station is an unstaffed halt on the Cambrian Coast Railway with passenger services to Harlech, Porthmadog, Pwllheli, Barmouth, Machynlleth and Shrewsbury. Most trains call only on request.

The station platform is located on a narrow ledge below the village of Llanaber and immediately above a rocky beach.

Since 22 June 2020, trains have not called at the station due to the short platform and the inability to maintain social distancing between passengers and the guard when opening the train door.

January 2014 storms

On 3 January 2014 wave action washed away  of track bed and deposited  of debris on the line. Through services to  remained suspended until 1 September due to rebuilding work on the Pont Briwet viaduct to the north at Penrhyndeudraeth.

References

External links

Railway stations in Gwynedd
DfT Category F2 stations
Former Cambrian Railway stations
Railway stations in Great Britain opened in 1911
Railway stations served by Transport for Wales Rail
Railway request stops in Great Britain
Barmouth